UNIT: The Wasting is a Big Finish Productions audio drama based on the long-running British science fiction television series Doctor Who. It stars Nicholas Courtney reprising his role as Brigadier Lethbridge-Stewart, the former commander of UNIT (United Nations Intelligence Taskforce). "The Wasting" is the final play of a four-part mini-series.

Plot 
As a mysterious plague threatens the world's population, UNIT faces its final battle with ICIS.

Cast
The Brigadier - Nicholas Courtney
Colonel Emily Chaudhry - Siri O'Neal
Colonel Ross Brimmicombe-Wood - David Tennant
Sergeant Willis - Nora Brande
Andrea Winnington - Sara Carver
Francis Currie - Michael Hobbs
George - Adrian McLoughlin
Prime Minister - Steffan Rhodri
Corporal McLeish - Alex Zorbas

Notes
An introduction to the UNIT series, UNIT: The Coup was given away free with Doctor Who Magazine #351 and is currently available to download for free from the Big Finish website.
The series sees UNIT in an ongoing battle with its xenophobic rival, ICIS.
The short story "The Terror of the Darkness" in the collection Short Trips: A Day in the Life revealed that Chaudhry and Hoffman had previously travelled with the Sixth Doctor. Their adventures continued in "Incongruous Details" (Short Trips: The Centenarian).
Colonel Ross Brimmicombe-Wood also appears in Sympathy for the Devil. "The Wasting" was recorded shortly before David Tennant started filming as the Tenth Doctor.
The Wasting is directed by Nicola Bryant, best known for playing the Fifth and Sixth Doctor's companion, Peri Brown. In this audio drama, she plays Sergeant Willis under the pseudonym "Nora Brande".

External links
 Big Finish Productions - UNIT: The Wasting

Wasting
2005 audio plays